James Merriman (23 October 1816 – 13 May 1883) was an Australian cooper, whaler, publican, shipowner, alderman, mayor of Sydney and member of the New South Wales Parliament.

Biography

Early years
He was born at Parramatta to George and Mary Merriman. His parents died while he was very young and he and his sister Mary were raised by guardians. By 1828 they were lodging with Sydney merchant Joseph Raphael and his wife. He was indentured as a cooper, and later served on whaling vessels for four years. In 1843 he married Anne Thompson, with whom he had five children, one of whom, George Merriman (1845–1893), would later serve as a politician, representing West Sydney in the Legislative Assembly from 1882 to 1889.

He was trading to the Pacific Islands by 1844.

Publican

In July 1847 he applied for the license of the Whalers' Arms public house, Windmill Street, Miller's Point; one of three pubs with that name in Sydney at the time. He remained the licensee till September 1855. In 1856 he applied for the licence to the Grafton Hotel, 26 Kent Street, Sydney. He had left that hotel by 1862 and moved on to another pub in Millers Point, the Gladstone Hotel. That one he left in January 1863.

As the 1850s went his commercial interests began to shift to maritime activities and shipping.

Shipowner
From about 1850 he was a shipping agent for vessels trading between Sydney, the Pacific Islands and New Zealand. He was also the owner of a number of ships. In 1872 his vessel the barque James Merriman was lost at sea while engaged in the pearl shell fishery in Torres Strait.

Landlord
He seems to have been a considerable property owner in Sydney. In December 1862 he advertised for tradesmen to repair seven houses in Argyle St, Millers Point.

Politician
From 1867 to 1883 he served on Sydney City Council, including periods as mayor in 1873 and from 1877 to 1878. In 1877 he was elected to the New South Wales Legislative Assembly for West Sydney, but he did not re-contest in 1880.

He was made a trustee of the Wentworth Park Trust in July 1878. In December of that year he was appointed as a member of the Sydney International Exhibition Commission.

Merriman died in Sydney on 12 May 1883.

Legacy
Crown Road in Miller's Point was renamed Merriman Street in 1875.

After his death in 1883 The Bulletin offered this evaluation.

References

 

1816 births
1883 deaths
Members of the New South Wales Legislative Assembly
Mayors and Lord Mayors of Sydney
19th-century Australian politicians
19th-century Australian businesspeople
Australian ship owners
Australian people in whaling